Saint Ingrid of Skänninge (died in Skänninge, 9 September 1282) was a Swedish abbess venerated as a saint in the Roman Catholic Church. She founded Skänninge Abbey, a nunnery belonging to the Dominicans, in 1272. Her feast day is on September 2.

Life
Ingrid was the daughter of Elof, a nobleman from Östergötland. She was a member of the family Elofssönernas ätt, and belonged to the elite of the Swedish nobility. She had at least two brothers, Anders and Johan, the latter of whom was a knight of the Teutonic Order. Her niece, Kristina Johansdotter (d. 1293), was the first spouse of Birger Persson, who became the father of Bridget of Sweden in his second marriage. It is believed that Ingrid was an inspiration of Bridget.

Ingrid married a nobleman referred to as Sir Sigge, who likely died in 1271. After being widowed, Ingrid and her sister Kristina became a part of a circle of pious females around the Dominican friar Petrus de Dacia in Skänninge. In one of his letters, Petrus de Dacia has left a description of the ascetic life style and mystic revelations of one of his "spiritual daughters" in this circle of women, which likely refers to Ingrid.

In 1272, this circle of women formed an informal convent under the leadership of Ingrid by adopting the habit of the Dominicans and practicing its rules. Ingrid made pilgrimages to Santiago de Compostela, Jerusalem and Rome. After the death of her sister, Ingrid applied for formal recognition of her convent. This was granted in 1281, a year before her death.

Veneration 
After her death in 1282, Ingrid's remains became objects of veneration and pilgrimages to her convent. She was, however, not formally recognized by the Pope as a saint. When her relative Bridget of Sweden was formally canonized by Pope Boniface IX on 7 October 1391, it caused a need to have Ingrid recognized as a saint as well. At the Council of Costance, an application was made for the cause of her canonization. In 1499, Pope Alexander VI agreed to a translation of her remains, which took place in Skänninge Abbey in 1507.

Legacy
Following the Swedish Reformation, the remains of Ingrid were removed to the Vadstena Abbey. In 1645, the skull was stolen from the Vadstena church by Antoine de Beaulieu, who believed it to be the skull of Bridget of Sweden. Antoine de Beaulieu gave Ingrid's skull to the French ambassador Gaspard Coignet de la Thullerie, who in turn placed it in the Church of Courson-les-Carrières in France. In 1959, it was given to the Bridgettine abbey of Mary's Refuge in Uden, The Netherlands, where it was exhibited as the skull of Bridget of Sweden.

References

Further reading
 Carlquist, Gunnar, red (1932). Svensk uppslagsbok. Bd 13. Malmö: Svensk Uppslagsbok AB. sid. 1097
 DNA skriver historia - Forskning & Framsteg
 Birgittas stulna skalle, en kriminalgåta på väg att lösas? - Barbro Lindqvist, Signum
 Ingrid Elofsdotter (Elofssönernas ätt) i Wilhelmina Stålberg, Anteckningar om svenska qvinnor (1864)
 Ingrid Elofsdotter, urn:sbl:11967, Svenskt biografiskt lexikon (art av Jarl Gallén), hämtad 2015-04-13.

13th-century Swedish nuns
1282 deaths
Swedish Roman Catholic abbesses
Dominican saints
Medieval Swedish saints
13th-century Christian saints
Year of birth unknown
Female saints of medieval Sweden
Swedish Roman Catholic saints